Abbasabad (also Romanized as ‘Abbāsābād) is a village in Kermajan Rural District, in the Central District of Kangavar County, Kermanshah Province, Iran. At the 2006 census, its population was 455, in 102 families.

References 

Populated places in Kangavar County